Asociación Deportiva Apopa is a professional soccer team of the El Salvadorian city of Apopa.

History
In 2015, the club was granted a license to compete in the newly expanded segunda division El Salvador.

Rivalry
Apopa's current biggest rivalry was with fellow and Older Apopa based team C.D. Vendaval, against whom they contest the derby Apopense.

Honours

Domestic honours
 Segunda División Salvadorean and predecessors 
 Champions (1) : TBD
 Tercera División Salvadorean and predecessors 
 Champions:(1) : TBD

List of Coaches
El Salvador:
   Marcos Antonio Portillo (2015–)

References

External links

Football clubs in El Salvador
1927 establishments in El Salvador
Association football clubs established in 1927